CNaPS Sport is a football club from Madagascar based in Miarinarivo.

Achievements
THB Champions League : 7
 2010, 2013, 2014, 2015, 2016, 2017, 2018.

Coupe de Madagascar : 3
 2011, 2015, 2016.

Super Coupe de Madagascar : 1
 2010.

Performance in CAF competitions
CAF Champions League: 2 appearances
2011 – Preliminary Round
2014 – Preliminary Round

Players

References

External links
Official website
Global Sports Archive team profile

Football clubs in Madagascar